is a 1992–1998 OVA series based on Mitsuteru Yokoyama's manga series Giant Robo. It was written and directed by Yasuhiro Imagawa.

Giant Robo is a homage to Yokoyama's career. The series features characters and plotlines from the manga artist's entire canon of work, effectively creating an all-new story. The events take place in the near future, 10 years after the advent of the Shizuma Drive triggers the third energy revolution. The series follows the master of the titular Robo, Daisaku Kusama, and the Experts of Justice, an international police organization locked in battle with the BF Group, a secret society hell-bent on world domination.

The OVA is recognized for its "retro" style and operatic score. The character designs emulate Yokoyama's drawing style and the action setpieces are influenced by Hong Kong action cinema.

The first installment of the series, "The Black Attaché Case", was released on July 22, 1992. Originally intended to finish within 36 months, the seven-volume series was ultimately released over the span of six years. "The Grand Finale" was released on January 25, 1998. The OVA has since been translated into English, Cantonese, Dutch, French, Italian and Korean.

Plot 
The series takes place in a retro-futuristic setting, where the Shizuma Drive ends the depletion of petroleum resources and the need for nuclear power. The system is a non-polluting recyclable energy source that powers everything on land, sea and air. Ten years prior to the events of the series a team of scientists, led by Professor Shizuma, created the revolutionary system. In the process they nearly destroyed the world and one of their own, Franken von Vogler, was lost in the event that went down in history as the "Tragedy of Bashtarle." At the start of Giant Robo, the BF Group is in the middle of recreating the event with aid from the resurfaced von Vogler.

The story explores a society completely brought down, within the span of one week, because of dependency on a single energy source and a state of prosperity tainted by compromise and deceit.

The  is the main antagonist of the series. Their origin is unknown, but not so their reason to be: to lead mankind down a road of ruin.

At the time of The Day the Earth Stood Still, the Ten are gearing up for the final showdown with the IPO.

The  is the BF Group's counterpart in the Giant Robo universe. The leaders of the world acknowledged Big Fire as a threat to world security and signed the charter creating the IPO. The IPO's methods are information and espionage, looking to bring down the BF Group rather than defeating them in an all-out war.

However, to counter Big Fire's superhuman elements, "Experts" are recruited and granted special international jurisdiction. Working with the Experts from the Peking Branch is Daisaku Kusama. While he does not possess any special powers, Daisaku is the one and only master of Giant Robo. Constructed by Daisaku's father, Giant Robo is the IPO's trump card against Big Fire.

Production 
In 1990, producer Yasuhito Yamaki approached Yasuhiro Imagawa about working on an animated version of the Giant Robo manga. Imagawa, a self-proclaimed fan of Yokoyama's work, jumped at the chance of working on the project. The Giant Robo manga had started in 1967 and had never been adapted into animation before. It had a live action adaptation that premiered on TV Asahi in 1967–68.

In pre-production, Imagawa was informed he could not use any of the supporting characters from the manga or live action versions. Instead, with Yokoyama's permission, he populated the series with characters from the artist's entire canon of work, including Akakage, Babel II and Godmars. The Giant Robo OVA still follows Daisaku and Robo, and the main antagonist is still called "Big Fire," but it features an all-new storyline with a completely different cast of characters.

The first episode was released July 22, 1992 with the following three installments staying close to the proposed schedule of six months between releases. In the nine months between the releases of Volumes 4 and 5, two OVAs focusing on the character of GinRei were produced.  is a humorous take on GinRei's job as a spy for the IPO. , a send up of super robot series, features Ken Ishikawa as guest mech designer. A third OVA, was released after Volume 5 of Giant Robo.

The final episode was released January 1998, almost three years after episode six. In between releases, members of the Giant Robo staff worked on other projects, including The Big O, Getter Robo Armageddon, and Super Atragon, a two-episode OVA of Shunro Oshikawa's Kaitei Gunkan novel.

Imagawa intended The Day the Earth Stood Still to be the second to final chapter in the conflict between the Experts of Justice and Big Fire. The OVA would be preceded by The Birth of Zangetsu the Midday, The Plan to Assassinate Daisaku - the Canary Penitentiary, The Boy of Three Days, The Greatest Battle in History - General Kanshin vs. Shokatsu Koumei and The Boy Detective, Kindaichi Shōtarō, Appears! The final chapter is titled The Siege of Babel. No further stories have been animated.

Music 

The score of Giant Robo was composed, arranged and conducted by Masamichi Amano and performed by the Warsaw Philharmonic Orchestra and Choir. The music ranges from grand pieces like "Charge! His Name is Giant Robo" to more light-hearted tracks like "Tetsugyu in Love." Amano makes use of leitmotifs, recurring musical themes associated with different characters, places or events.

Giant Robo's "Dies Irae" is first heard during the destruction of the Champs-Élysées in episode one. The hymn, written in Medieval Latin, describes what is known in Christian eschatology as Judgment Day. Along with Amano's original compositions, the soundtrack features "Una furtiva lagrima" from the 1832 opera L'elisir d'amore. For Imagawa, the aria embodies one of the themes of Giant Robo: "the sorrow of others not understanding your true feelings".

The music of Giant Robo has been called one of the OVA's best accomplishments.  The complete score was released in seven soundtracks by Nippon Columbia. The first two soundtracks were released in North America by AnimeTrax.

Episodes

Design 
For series director Yasuhiro Imagawa, the world where the story unfolds must be convincing, for it is the setting and themes what determine the character and mecha designs. In the world of Giant Robo, "anything goes". The technology is futuristic and the morals are modern. The world's outlook is bright, but there is an underlying sense of some sinister motive beneath it. Wuxia heroes coexist with modern-day espers and giant robots as soldiers in a struggle between good and evil.

Art style 
The Giant Robo OVA is one of many anime titles based on old properties produced in Japan during the 1990s. While titles like Bubblegum Crisis 2040, Dirty Pair Flash and Tekkaman Blade gave modern spins to old classics, the creators of Giant Robo decided to go with a "retro" look.

The characters were designed by Toshiyuki Kubooka (Lunar series, The Idolmaster) and Akihiko Yamashita. (Princess Nine, Tide-Line Blue) The designers were asked to emulate Yokoyama's characters rather than create new ones. Admittedly "it took some time to catch on to Director Imagawa's intentions", but with repetition the staff was able to achieve Imagawa's vision of characters that look like they stepped out of anime from the 1960s.

The mechanical design is a case of high technology meets old school engineering. The titular mecha is an advanced piece of machinery, equipped with booster rockets and hidden weapons throughout. Sporting big stovepipe arms and exposed rivets,  the hulking giant is more like a weapon of mass destruction than a "robot superhero". Vehicles like the Shizuma-powered Beetle or the Experts' airship fortress in the design of a zeppelin appear as if they had been conceived at the turn of the 20th century, giving the world of Giant Robo a timeless feel.

Giant Robo is credited with generating interest in re-imagining other artists' works, including Osamu Tezuka and Go Nagai, and creating a "retro" style that has been used in productions like Sakura Wars.

Influences 
The modern notion of the giant robot genre can be traced back to the 1970s. The works of Go Nagai (Mazinger, Getter Robo) created the genre and the debut of Yoshiyuki Tomino's Mobile Suit Gundam in 1979 solidified it. In this genre, the mecha is the focal point of the action. But for a genre anime, Giant Robo does not feature many giant robot battles; instead, it is the human characters who do the fighting.

Most of the "Experts" featured in The Day the Earth Stood Still come from Yokoyama's manga adaptations of Outlaws of the Marsh and Romance of the Three Kingdoms, both wuxia novels and half of the "Four Classics" of Chinese literature. Wuxia are martial arts adventures populated by skilled, honorable fighters. In Hong Kong action cinema, the genre is associated with swordplay epics sprinkled with mysticism.

Given their origin, the heroes and villains of Giant Robo are superhuman combatants who share many elements with the errant knights of wuxia like strength, magic powers and the ability to fly. In wuxia adventures, the characters are given nicknames that allude to their mastery of weapons, their physical appearance or their demeanor (Crouching Tiger, Hidden Dragon). Imagawa, inspired by Yokayama's adaptation of Outlaws of the Marsh, followed this convention and gave Giant Robo'''s characters similar descriptive names like "Shockwave Alberto", "Silent Chūjō" and "Kenji The Immortal."

In jiang hu, secret societies plot against the status quo (House of Flying Daggers) and powerful clans do war with each other. Giant Robo features the ongoing conflict between the Experts of Justice and the BF Group. Woven into the story are values commonly associated with martial arts films like honor, loyalty and individual justice, best exemplified in the rivalry between Alberto and Taisō.

 Themes Giant Robo is structured as a "character driven drama," emphasizing the relationships and personal histories of the characters over a mystery surrounding the titular mecha or a philosophical diatribe. At the time of the series, Daisaku is 12 years old and the only child in the Experts of Justice. Giant Robo is the story of how Daisaku grows up and works to respect his father's last will and testament of protecting the world from the BF Group.

The OVA is comparable to a bildungsroman, where the story traces the main character's development from childhood to maturity. The two most important characters in the boy's coming of age are his fellow Experts Tetsugyu and Kenji Murasame. Tetsugyu is a grown-up, but still a "child" at heart. In the course of the story he and Daisaku grow up and mature, creating a parallel between them. Kenji, on the other hand, is what Daisaku sees as an "adult." Willing to sacrifice others for the sake of happiness, Kenji contrasts Daisaku's idealism.

The story delves on the relationship between fathers and sons and the unbreakable bond that exists between them. The characters of Daisaku and Genya lost their fathers at a young age and have been entrusted with a legacy that turns them into adversaries during The Day the Earth Stood Still. Mirror images of one another, the characters fight to fulfill their respective fathers' dying wish at the expense of the other's.

Dr. Kusama's dying question to Daisaku ("Can happiness be obtained without sacrifice? Can a new era be achieved without tragedy?") is at the crux of the series. Shizuma and his colleagues gave the world a new era of prosperity at the expense of billions of lives. The BF Group is willing to cause great misfortune to make their ideal world a reality, while many sacrifice themselves to protect it. The ending is bittersweet, with both sides suffering losses. For Imagawa, this was the only way of getting his point across. The series ends with a dedication to all fathers and their children "giving a glimmer of hope in the midst of all the sorrow."

The series may also be seen as "sort of an analogy or an allegory about nuclear technology", especially in the context of Japan's complex relationship to both its destructive and constructive aspects.

Release
The series was originally released by Bandai Visual on VHS and LaserDisc from 1992 to 1998. On March 24, 2000, Toshiba Entertainment released the series on Region 2 DVD. The Giant Robo Giga Premium Collection (ASBY-1600) features digitally remastered video and audio, interviews with the creators and a companion book. Then, Media Factory released a limited edition Blu-ray Box on October 26, 2012, with the video remastered to 4K, as well as the NYAV Post English dub, interviews with the staff and Japanese cast, audio commentary by the staff, and a performance by the Warsaw National Philharmonic Orchestra. A standard edition Blu-ray Box was released on April 24, 2015, this time with English subtitles included.

The distribution of the English-language version has been handled by five different companies. A LaserDisc edition was released by L.A. Hero in 1994. After L.A. Hero's license expired, it was released on VHS by U.S. Renditions and Manga Entertainment. After Manga Entertainment's license expired, Media Blasters released Giant Robo on DVD. Media Blasters' 2004 release includes the Japanese language track, the Manga Entertainment dub, an all-new dub by NYAV Post and subtitled Japanese commentary tracks on some of the episodes. After Media Blasters' license expired, Discotek Media announced at Otakon 2018 on August 12 that they have picked up the series for a Blu-ray release. Despite the included Gin Rei OVA being in a separate DVD release, it would include everything from Media Blasters' previous release. Discotek has also hoped to produce brand new extras for this release as well. It was released on December 24, 2019, while the Gin Rei release was released on December 29, 2020.Giant Robo was distributed in the Netherlands by Manga DVD and in Hong Kong by Asia Video. The French version, dubbed by Saint Maur Studios, was distributed by Pathé. The series was released in Italy by Granata Press.

 Related media
Along with the animated version, Imagawa scripted a manga illustrated by Mari Mizuta. Serialized in Kadokawa Shoten's Comic Genki, it delves deeper into the machinations of the BF Group and introduces  as Big Fire's counterpart in the IPO. The issues were later collected in two volumes published under the Newtype 100% Comics imprint.

 Giant Robo Volume 1 released August 1992
 Giant Robo Volume 2 released September 1993

A novelization by Hiroshi Yamaguchi was released in September 1993.

In commemoration of Giant Robos 40th anniversary, Imagawa began scripting . The manga, illustrated by Yasunari Toda, was serialized in Akita Shoten's Champion Red between September 2006 and January 2011. It chronicles Daisaku's involvement in a three-way battle between the IPO, the Magnificent Ten and the Murasame Clan. The Day the Earth Burned follows the general tone and style of the OVA, but takes place in a reality separate from that of the OVA; The Day the Earth Burned explores what the OVA did not: the true nature of the GR Project and the true leader of Big Fire, Big Fire himself.

  (released on March 20, 2007)
  (released on September 20, 2007)
  (released on March 19, 2008)
  (released on September 19, 2008)
  (released on April 20, 2009)
  (released on September 18, 2009)
  (released on May 20, 2010)
  (released on November 19, 2010)
  (released on April 20, 2011)

The Giant Robo video game (SLPM-62526) was released for PlayStation 2 on November 3, 2004 by D3 Publisher. Set in The Day the Earth Stood Still continuity, the player leads Daisaku Kusama and Giant Robo on a quest to defeat the BF Group. As Daisaku, the player can pick up items and power-ups on the battlefield; as Giant Robo, the player does battle with other mechas. A Versus Mode allows players to compete against each other using any of the robots featured on the series. The game is not available in Europe or North America.Mighty Ginrei: Final Fight (COCC-12444), an audio drama sequel to the Mighty GinRei OVA, was released on April 21, 1995, by Nippon Columbia. Love Fight, a music collection tie-in, was released the same day.

 Reception 
The final installment of Giant Robo was released on January 25, 1998, eight years after production began and a full decade since its inception. The feature suffered from high running costs and low sales, but was better received in America. The series appeared in the 62nd position of Animage's Top 100 Anime List, published in January 2001. In July of the same year, the series appeared on a list of the all time top 50 anime, according to Wizard Magazine.

Critical reception has been largely positive. Hyper magazine rated it 10 out of 10 in 1996. Three different reviewers from the AnimeOnDVD site gave Giant Robo an "A+". John Huxley of Anime Boredom "highly recommends" the series and Anime Academy gives it a grade of 88%.Giant Robo has been called "one of the true timeless classics of Anime." Mike Crandol of Anime News Network says Imagawa "takes the best of the old and mixes it with the best of the new to create the definitive giant robot story." John Huxley of Anime Boredom concludes the series is "the super robot show as it was in your mind's eye, a perfect combination of the old without the disappointment of reality."

 References 

 External links 
 
 
 Giant Robo'' in the Japan Hero Encyclopedia

1992 anime OVAs
Apocalyptic anime and manga
Chinese mythology in anime and manga
Crossover anime and manga
Discotek Media
Giant Robo
Martial arts anime and manga
Peak oil films
Super robot anime and manga